Founded in 1922, Western Economic Association International (WEAI) is a non-profit academic society dedicated to the encouragement and dissemination of economic research and analysis. WEAI's principal activities include the publishing of two quarterly journals, and the staging of conferences.

Purpose
From WEAI's 2009 Bylaws: "The purposes and objectives for which the Western Economic Association International is formed shall be: (a) the encouragement of economic research and discussion; (b) the encouragement of freedom in economic discussion; and (c) the issuance of publications for the purpose of disseminating knowledge on economic subjects.  The corporation shall take no partisan attitude, nor will it commit its Members to any position on theoretical or practical economic questions."

Journals

Economic Inquiry
Published since 1962, (formerly Western Economic Journal), EI is a highly regarded scholarly journal in economics, publishing articles of general interest across the profession. Besides containing research on all economics topic areas, a principal objective is to make each article understandable to economists who are not necessarily specialists in the article's topic area. EI was one of the first journals to publish humor papers (now called Miscellany) with the still highly downloaded article "Life Among the Econ" by Axel Leijonhufvud, and more recently "The Theory of Interstellar Trade: by Paul Krugman. In 2007, then editor R. Preston McAfee introduced the innovative No Revisions policy for submitted manuscripts. Published in cooperation with Wiley-Blackwell, EI's worldwide circulation is approximately 15,800. Tim Salmon, Southern Methodist University, is the current editor.

Contemporary Economic Policy
First published in 1982 as Contemporary Policy Issues, Contemporary Economic Policy publishes scholarly research and analysis on important policy issues facing society. CEP publishes essays analyzing specific policy issues, surveys of important general subject areas, and research articles devoted to developing new methods for policy analysis. Published in cooperation with Wiley-Blackwell, CEP's worldwide circulation is approximately 15,400. Brad Humphreys, West Virginia University, is the current editor.

Conferences

Annual Conferences
Held each summer between mid-June and mid-July, WEAI Annual Conferences provide the opportunity for more than 1,000 economists from around the world to meet and exchange ideas. An average of 300 concurrent sessions are held with participants presenting individual research papers, serving as discussants for papers, chairing sessions, and also organizing entire sessions on the topics of their choice. Other academic societies with similar objectives to WEAI participate as Allied Societies regularly holding sessions and sometimes their own annual meetings in conjunction with WEAI conferences. Conference highlights include the Annual WEAI Presidential Address as well as the Association's newest member-sponsored program, the Graduate Student Dissertation Workshop.

International Conferences
Held since 1994 in cities like Hong Kong, Taipei, Bangkok, Sydney, Beijing, Kyoto, Brisbane, Santiago, Singapore, Newcastle, and Tokyo, the International Conferences have become a highly successful marketplace of ideas for economists from around the world. Partnerships have been established in the organizing of these conferences with universities and organizations such as Keio University, University of Newcastle, Pontifical Catholic University of Chile, Queensland University of Technology School of Business, Ryukoku University, Guanghua School of Management Peking University, Academia Sinica, and Hong Kong Economic Association. A smaller format than the Annual Conference, the International Conference program generally consists of 80 to 100 sessions including 300 to 600 economists serving as paper presenters, discussants, chairs, and session organizers. Keynote speakers include Nobel Laureates such as James Heckman, Ken Arrow, Robert Engle, Daniel McFadden, and Peter Diamond.

Past, Present, and Future WEAI Presidents

Asterisk (*) indicates recipient of the Sveriges Riksbank Prize in Economic Sciences in Memory of Alfred Nobel

 1922 Alfred C. Schmitt
 1923 Eliot Jones
 1924 Rockwell D. Hunt
 1925 Howard T. Lewis
 1926 Edwin C. Robbins
 1927 Theodore H. Boggs
 1928 Ira B. Cross
 1929 Howard S. Nobel
 1930 Thomas A. Beal
 1931 John A. Bexell—Kenneth Duncan (Acting Pres.)
 1932 Shirley J. Coon
 1933 Clement Akerman
 1934 Reid L. McClung
 1935 W. L. Wanlass—Glenn E. Hoover (Acting Pres.)
 1936 Kenneth Duncan
 1937 John B. Canning
 1938 James K. Hall
 1939 Richard B. Heflebower
 1940 Arthur G. Coons
 1941 Robert D. Calkins
 1942 Bernard F. Haley—James H. Gilbert (Acting Pres.)
 1943-5 James H. Gilbert
 1946 John B. Condliffe
 1947 William S. Hopkins
 1948 Robert G. Pettengill
 1949 Glenn E. Hoover
 1950 Dilworth Walker
 1951 John A. Guthrie
 1952 Oliver P. Wheeler
 1953 M. M. Stockwell
 1954 Clifford E. Maser
 1955 Gault W. Lynn
 1956 Kenneth L. Trefftzs
 1957 Floyd A. Bond
 1958 Frank L. Kidner
 1959 Paul L. Kleinsorge
 1960 J. Fred Weston
 1961 Ralph I. Thayer
 1962 William O. Jones
 1963 Wytze Gorter
 1964 Phillip W. Cartwright
 1965 George Cady
 1966 Paul Simpson
 1967 G. N. Rostvold
 1968 Dean A. Worcester
 1969 Walter J. Mead
 1970 Charles B. Friday
 1971 William R. Allen
 1972 Thomas R. Saving
 1973 Earl R. Rolph
 1974 Karl Brunner
 1975 Armen Alchian
 1976 Douglass North*
 1977 H. Scott Gordon
 1978 Howard Bowen
 1979 Thomas Mayer
 1980 Donald F. Gordon
 1981 Kenneth J. Arrow*
 1982 M. Bruce Johnson
 1983 Abba P. Lerner—James M. Buchanan* (Acting Pres.)
 1984 James M. Buchanan*
 1985 Milton Friedman*
 1986 Allan H. Meltzer
 1987 Robert W. Clower
 1988 Anna Schwartz
 1989 Moses Abramovitz
 1990 Arnold Harberger
 1991 Vernon L. Smith*
 1992 Walter Y. Oi
 1993 Jack Hirshleifer
 1994 Michael C. Jensen
 1995 Gordon Tullock
 1996 Harold Demsetz
 1997 Gary Becker*
 1998 Steven N. S. Cheung
 1999 Charles Plott
 2000 Oliver E. Williamson*
 2001 Michael R. Darby
 2002 Yoram Barzel
 2003 Clive Granger*
 2004 Janet Yellen
 2005 Robert Barro
 2006 Gary Libecap
 2007 James Heckman*
 2008 Paul Milgrom*
 2009 Michael D. Intriligator
 2010 Ronald W. Jones
 2011 Paul A. David
 2012 Richard Easterlin
 2013 Lucian A. Bebchuk
 2014 George G. Kaufman
 2015 John Pencavel
 2016 David Card*
 2017 Peter Diamond*
 2018 Orley Ashenfelter
 2019 Daniel McFadden*
 2020 John Shoven
 2021 Alan Auerbach
 2022 Christina Romer
 2023 Dora Costa
 2024 Janet Currie
 2025 Nancy Rose

Historical Timeline
 1922: First meeting held in Portland, organized by Alfred C. Schmidt as the Pacific Association of Collegiate Schools of Business and Departments of Economics. The association was originally formed to gather institutions together to discuss challenges and ideas for improvement in academia.
 1925: Conference renamed to Pacific Collegiate Economic and Commercial Conference.
 1928: Organization renamed to Pacific Coast Economic Association.
 1930: First conference held that included individual research papers, thus beginning the format used today.
 1933: First bylaws issued establishing individual association memberships.
 1942-45: Conferences suspended due to WWII.
 1962: Western Economic Journal first issued.
 1971: Association name changed to Western Economic Association.
 1977: WEJ name changed to Economic Inquiry.
 1982: Contemporary Policy Issues first issued.
 1994: First Pacific Rim conference held in Hong Kong.
 1994: CPI name changed to Contemporary Economic Policy.
 2019: Largest annual conference to date with 379 sessions.
 2022: First hybrid conference held June 29-July 3 in Portland, Oregon.

References

Professional associations based in the United States
Business and finance professional associations
Economics societies